The Japanese name Akizuki may refer to:

 Akizuki clan, a Japanese noble family
 Akizuki (surname)
 Akizuki rebellion, in 1876
 , several classes of Japanese warships
 , several Japanese ships